Cephaloziellaceae is a family of liverworts belonging to the order Jungermanniales.

Genera
Genera:
Allisoniella E.A.Hodgs.
Amphicephalozia R.M.Schust.
Anastrophyllopsis (R.M.Schust.) Vána & L.Söderstr.
Cephalojonesia Grolle
Cephalomitrion R.M.Schust. 
Cephaloziella (Spruce) Schiffn. 
Cephaloziopsis (Spruce) Schiffn.
Chaetophyllopsis R.M.Schust.
Cylindrocolea R.M.Schust.
Gottschelia Grolle
Gymnocoleopsis (R.M.Schust.) R.M.Schust.
Herzogobryum Grolle
Kymatocalyx Herzog
Lophonardia R.M.Schust. 
Nothogymnomitrion R.M.Schust. 
Obtusifolium S.W.Arnell
Oleolophozia L.Söderstr., De Roo & Hedd.
Phycolepidozia R.M.Schust.
Protolophozia (R.M.Schust.) Schljakov
Ruttnerella  - 1
Stenorrhipis  - 2

References

Jungermanniales
Liverwort families